The 1977–78 Pittsburgh Penguins season was their 11th in the National Hockey League. They finished fourth in the Norris Division, thus did not qualify for the Stanley Cup playoffs. This was their worst regular season since 1974, with only 68 points, and the first time since 1974 that the Penguins did not qualify for the playoffs.

Off-season
In the off-season head coach Ken Schinkel was replaced by former Kings, Red Wings and Rockies head coach Johnny Wilson. Veterans Vic Hadfield and Ed Van Impe retired. Defensive forward J. Bob Kelly's contract ended and he took his services to Chicago, while Captain Ron Schock was traded to the Sabres (Jean Pronovost was named captain in his place).

Regular season
In an attempt to replace Kelly general manager Baz Bastien acquired former Flyer enforcer Dave Schultz early in the season, but the price was high: Syl Apps, Jr., one of the team's all-time leading scorers. Schultz was traded the following season.

Frustrated with the performance of talented winger Pierre Larouche, Bastien dealt the 22-year-old to the Montreal Canadiens for veteran Pete Mahovlich and prospect Peter Lee on November 29, 1977. Larouche would go on to win two Stanley Cup championships with the Canadiens, while Mahovlich was traded to the Red Wings less than two years later. Lee would fail to live up to his promise, scoring an average of only 0.57 points per game over the course of six seasons with the Penguins.

The high roster turnover, particularly from three of the previous season's top five scorers, contributed to the Penguins missing the playoffs for the first time in four seasons.

Division standings

Schedule and results

|- style="background:#cfc;"
| 1 || Oct 12 || St. Louis Blues || 2–4 || Pittsburgh Penguins || The Checkerdome || 1–0–0 || 2
|- style="background:#fcf;"
| 2 || Oct 14 || Pittsburgh Penguins || 1–2 || Washington Capitals || Capital Centre || 1–1–0 || 2
|- style="background:#fcf;"
| 3 || Oct 15 || Philadelphia Flyers || 8–2 || Pittsburgh Penguins || The Spectrum || 1–2–0 || 2
|- style="background:#ffc;"
| 4 || Oct 19 || Pittsburgh Penguins || 3–3 || New York Rangers || Madison Square Garden (IV) || 1–2–1 || 3
|- style="background:#fcf;"
| 5 || Oct 20 || Pittsburgh Penguins || 0–11 || Philadelphia Flyers || The Spectrum || 1–3–1 || 3
|- style="background:#cfc;"
| 6 || Oct 22 || Atlanta Flames || 2–5 || Pittsburgh Penguins || Omni Coliseum || 2–3–1 || 5
|- style="background:#cfc;"
| 7 || Oct 23 || Pittsburgh Penguins || 3–2 || Cleveland Barons || Coliseum at Richfield || 3–3–1 || 7
|- style="background:#fcf;"
| 8 || Oct 26 || Detroit Red Wings || 4–3 || Pittsburgh Penguins || Olympia Stadium || 3–4–1 || 7
|- style="background:#fcf;"
| 9 || Oct 29 || Boston Bruins || 5–3 || Pittsburgh Penguins || Boston Garden || 3–5–1 || 7
|-

|- style="background:#fcf;"
| 10 || Nov 2 || Pittsburgh Penguins || 1–3 || Detroit Red Wings || Olympia Stadium || 3–6–1 || 7
|- style="background:#fcf;"
| 11 || Nov 4 || Pittsburgh Penguins || 2–5 || Atlanta Flames || Omni Coliseum || 3–7–1 || 7
|- style="background:#fcf;"
| 12 || Nov 5 || Pittsburgh Penguins || 3–4 || New York Islanders || Nassau Veterans Memorial Coliseum || 3–8–1 || 7
|- style="background:#cfc;"
| 13 || Nov 9 || Cleveland Barons || 3–5 || Pittsburgh Penguins || Coliseum at Richfield || 4–8–1 || 9
|- style="background:#cfc;"
| 14 || Nov 12 || Chicago Black Hawks || 4–7 || Pittsburgh Penguins || Chicago Stadium || 5–8–1 || 11
|- style="background:#ffc;"
| 15 || Nov 13 || Pittsburgh Penguins || 3–3 || Buffalo Sabres || Buffalo Memorial Auditorium || 5–8–2 || 12
|- style="background:#fcf;"
| 16 || Nov 16 || Pittsburgh Penguins || 4–7 || Minnesota North Stars || Met Center || 5–9–2 || 12
|- style="background:#ffc;"
| 17 || Nov 19 || New York Rangers || 5–5 || Pittsburgh Penguins || Madison Square Garden (IV) || 5–9–3 || 13
|- style="background:#ffc;"
| 18 || Nov 22 || Pittsburgh Penguins || 3–3 || Vancouver Canucks || Pacific Coliseum || 5–9–4 || 14
|- style="background:#fcf;"
| 19 || Nov 24 || Pittsburgh Penguins || 3–5 || Los Angeles Kings || The Forum || 5–10–4 || 14
|- style="background:#cfc;"
| 20 || Nov 26 || New York Islanders || 2–5 || Pittsburgh Penguins || Nassau Veterans Memorial Coliseum || 6–10–4 || 16
|- style="background:#fcf;"
| 21 || Nov 29 || Pittsburgh Penguins || 1–9 || Montreal Canadiens || Montreal Forum || 6–11–4 || 16
|- style="background:#cfc;"
| 22 || Nov 30 || Detroit Red Wings || 4–6 || Pittsburgh Penguins || Olympia Stadium || 7–11–4 || 18
|-

|- style="background:#ffc;"
| 23 || Dec 3 || Buffalo Sabres || 4–4 || Pittsburgh Penguins || Buffalo Memorial Auditorium || 7–11–5 || 19
|- style="background:#cfc;"
| 24 || Dec 4 || Pittsburgh Penguins || 4–2 || Washington Capitals || Capital Centre || 8–11–5 || 21
|- style="background:#ffc;"
| 25 || Dec 6 || Pittsburgh Penguins || 3–3 || Colorado Rockies || McNichols Sports Arena || 8–11–6 || 22
|- style="background:#fcf;"
| 26 || Dec 8 || Los Angeles Kings || 5–3 || Pittsburgh Penguins || The Forum || 8–12–6 || 22
|- style="background:#fcf;"
| 27 || Dec 10 || Pittsburgh Penguins || 2–6 || Boston Bruins || Boston Garden || 8–13–6 || 22
|- style="background:#fcf;"
| 28 || Dec 11 || Atlanta Flames || 5–1 || Pittsburgh Penguins || Omni Coliseum || 8–14–6 || 22
|- style="background:#fcf;"
| 29 || Dec 14 || Pittsburgh Penguins || 2–3 || St. Louis Blues || The Checkerdome || 8–15–6 || 22
|- style="background:#cfc;"
| 30 || Dec 17 || Montreal Canadiens || 3–5 || Pittsburgh Penguins || Montreal Forum || 9–15–6 || 24
|- style="background:#ffc;"
| 31 || Dec 22 || Pittsburgh Penguins || 3–3 || Buffalo Sabres || Buffalo Memorial Auditorium || 9–15–7 || 25
|- style="background:#fcf;"
| 32 || Dec 23 || Toronto Maple Leafs || 6–2 || Pittsburgh Penguins || Maple Leaf Gardens || 9–16–7 || 25
|- style="background:#cfc;"
| 33 || Dec 26 || Pittsburgh Penguins || 5–4 || Toronto Maple Leafs || Maple Leaf Gardens || 10–16–7 || 27
|- style="background:#ffc;"
| 34 || Dec 28 || Washington Capitals || 2–2 || Pittsburgh Penguins || Capital Centre || 10–16–8 || 28
|- style="background:#fcf;"
| 35 || Dec 29 || Pittsburgh Penguins || 3–4 || Montreal Canadiens || Montreal Forum || 10–17–8 || 28
|- style="background:#cfc;"
| 36 || Dec 31 || Cleveland Barons || 3–6 || Pittsburgh Penguins || Coliseum at Richfield || 11–17–8 || 30
|-

|- style="background:#fcf;"
| 37 || Jan 2 || Pittsburgh Penguins || 2–3 || Washington Capitals || Capital Centre || 11–18–8 || 30
|- style="background:#cfc;"
| 38 || Jan 4 || Vancouver Canucks || 3–8 || Pittsburgh Penguins || Pacific Coliseum || 12–18–8 || 32
|- style="background:#ffc;"
| 39 || Jan 7 || Los Angeles Kings || 3–3 || Pittsburgh Penguins || The Forum || 12–18–9 || 33
|- style="background:#cfc;"
| 40 || Jan 9 || Pittsburgh Penguins || 5–3 || New York Rangers || Madison Square Garden (IV) || 13–18–9 || 35
|- style="background:#fcf;"
| 41 || Jan 11 || Montreal Canadiens || 8–6 || Pittsburgh Penguins || Montreal Forum || 13–19–9 || 35
|- style="background:#ffc;"
| 42 || Jan 12 || Pittsburgh Penguins || 4–4 || Philadelphia Flyers || The Spectrum || 13–19–10 || 36
|- style="background:#cfc;"
| 43 || Jan 14 || Cleveland Barons || 2–4 || Pittsburgh Penguins || Coliseum at Richfield || 14–19–10 || 38
|- style="background:#fcf;"
| 44 || Jan 18 || Pittsburgh Penguins || 0–1 || Atlanta Flames || Omni Coliseum || 14–20–10 || 38
|- style="background:#fcf;"
| 45 || Jan 21 || Washington Capitals || 5–2 || Pittsburgh Penguins || Capital Centre || 14–21–10 || 38
|- style="background:#cfc;"
| 46 || Jan 22 || New York Rangers || 1–3 || Pittsburgh Penguins || Madison Square Garden (IV) || 15–21–10 || 40
|- style="background:#ffc;"
| 47 || Jan 28 || Buffalo Sabres || 3–3 || Pittsburgh Penguins || Buffalo Memorial Auditorium || 15–21–11 || 41
|- style="background:#fcf;"
| 48 || Jan 29 || Pittsburgh Penguins || 2–8 || Boston Bruins || Boston Garden || 15–22–11 || 41
|- style="background:#cfc;"
| 49 || Jan 31 || Pittsburgh Penguins || 5–3 || Detroit Red Wings || Olympia Stadium || 16–22–11 || 43
|-

|- style="background:#cfc;"
| 50 || Feb 1 || Minnesota North Stars || 1–6 || Pittsburgh Penguins || Met Center || 17–22–11 || 45
|- style="background:#fcf;"
| 51 || Feb 4 || Boston Bruins || 8–1 || Pittsburgh Penguins || Boston Garden || 17–23–11 || 45
|- style="background:#cfc;"
| 52 || Feb 7 || Pittsburgh Penguins || 4–2 || Colorado Rockies || McNichols Sports Arena || 18–23–11 || 47
|- style="background:#ffc;"
| 53 || Feb 11 || Pittsburgh Penguins || 3–3 || Los Angeles Kings || The Forum || 18–23–12 || 48
|- style="background:#cfc;"
| 54 || Feb 14 || Chicago Black Hawks || 1–2 || Pittsburgh Penguins || Chicago Stadium || 19–23–12 || 50
|- style="background:#ffc;"
| 55 || Feb 18 || Los Angeles Kings || 1–1 || Pittsburgh Penguins || The Forum || 19–23–13 || 51
|- style="background:#ffc;"
| 56 || Feb 19 || Pittsburgh Penguins || 2–2 || Chicago Black Hawks || Chicago Stadium || 19–23–14 || 52
|- style="background:#cfc;"
| 57 || Feb 21 || Pittsburgh Penguins || 5–4 || St. Louis Blues || The Checkerdome || 20–23–14 || 54
|- style="background:#ffc;"
| 58 || Feb 22 || St. Louis Blues || 2–2 || Pittsburgh Penguins || The Checkerdome || 20–23–15 || 55
|- style="background:#fcf;"
| 59 || Feb 25 || Philadelphia Flyers || 3–1 || Pittsburgh Penguins || The Spectrum || 20–24–15 || 55
|- style="background:#ffc;"
| 60 || Feb 26 || Pittsburgh Penguins || 4–4 || Buffalo Sabres || Buffalo Memorial Auditorium || 20–24–16 || 56
|-

|- style="background:#fcf;"
| 61 || Mar 1 || Montreal Canadiens || 5–2 || Pittsburgh Penguins || Montreal Forum || 20–25–16 || 56
|- style="background:#fcf;"
| 62 || Mar 4 || Pittsburgh Penguins || 3–6 || New York Islanders || Nassau Veterans Memorial Coliseum || 20–26–16 || 56
|- style="background:#ffc;"
| 63 || Mar 5 || New York Islanders || 3–3 || Pittsburgh Penguins || Nassau Veterans Memorial Coliseum || 20–26–17 || 57
|- style="background:#cfc;"
| 64 || Mar 8 || Colorado Rockies || 3–5 || Pittsburgh Penguins || McNichols Sports Arena || 21–26–17 || 59
|- style="background:#fcf;"
| 65 || Mar 11 || Vancouver Canucks || 3–1 || Pittsburgh Penguins || Pacific Coliseum || 21–27–17 || 59
|- style="background:#fcf;"
| 66 || Mar 12 || Toronto Maple Leafs || 7–1 || Pittsburgh Penguins || Maple Leaf Gardens || 21–28–17 || 59
|- style="background:#fcf;"
| 67 || Mar 14 || Pittsburgh Penguins || 2–4 || Los Angeles Kings || The Forum || 21–29–17 || 59
|- style="background:#fcf;"
| 68 || Mar 15 || Pittsburgh Penguins || 4–7 || Vancouver Canucks || Pacific Coliseum || 21–30–17 || 59
|- style="background:#cfc;"
| 69 || Mar 18 || Pittsburgh Penguins || 3–2 || Toronto Maple Leafs || Maple Leaf Gardens || 22–30–17 || 61
|- style="background:#fcf;"
| 70 || Mar 19 || Pittsburgh Penguins || 1–9 || Chicago Black Hawks || Chicago Stadium || 22–31–17 || 61
|- style="background:#fcf;"
| 71 || Mar 21 || Pittsburgh Penguins || 1–7 || Minnesota North Stars || Met Center || 22–32–17 || 61
|- style="background:#fcf;"
| 72 || Mar 22 || Colorado Rockies || 5–2 || Pittsburgh Penguins || McNichols Sports Arena || 22–33–17 || 61
|- style="background:#ffc;"
| 73 || Mar 25 || Detroit Red Wings || 2–2 || Pittsburgh Penguins || Olympia Stadium || 22–33–18 || 62
|- style="background:#fcf;"
| 74 || Mar 29 || Pittsburgh Penguins || 2–6 || Montreal Canadiens || Montreal Forum || 22–34–18 || 62
|- style="background:#fcf;"
| 75 || Mar 30 || Pittsburgh Penguins || 3–6 || Boston Bruins || Boston Garden || 22–35–18 || 62
|-

|- style="background:#cfc;"
| 76 || Apr 2 || Toronto Maple Leafs || 3–6 || Pittsburgh Penguins || Maple Leaf Gardens || 23–35–18 || 64
|- style="background:#cfc;"
| 77 || Apr 5 || Minnesota North Stars || 2–7 || Pittsburgh Penguins || Met Center || 24–35–18 || 66
|- style="background:#fcf;"
| 78 || Apr 6 || Pittsburgh Penguins || 4–6 || Detroit Red Wings || Olympia Stadium || 24–36–18 || 66
|- style="background:#fcf;"
| 79 || Apr 8 || Washington Capitals || 6–4 || Pittsburgh Penguins || Capital Centre || 24–37–18 || 66
|- style="background:#cfc;"
| 80 || Apr 9 || Pittsburgh Penguins || 3–2 || Cleveland Barons || Coliseum at Richfield || 25–37–18 || 68
|-

|- style="text-align:center;"
| Legend:       = Win       = Loss       = Tie

Playoffs
The Penguins failed to make the playoffs for the first time since the 1973–74 season, ending their three season playoff streak.

Player statistics
Skaters

Goaltenders

†Denotes player spent time with another team before joining the Penguins.  Stats reflect time with the Penguins only.
‡Denotes player was traded mid-season.  Stats reflect time with the Penguins only.

Awards and records

 Jean Pronovost established a career franchise record for games (753), goals (316) and points (603). He had led in goals since 1972 and games and points since 1973.
 Syl Apps, Jr. established a career franchise record for assists (349). He had led the category since 1972.
 Dave Schultz established a franchise record for penalty minutes in a season with 378. He was also the first to record 300 PIMs in a season, beating the previous high of 212 held by Bryan Watson.

Transactions

The Penguins were involved in the following transactions during the 1977–78 season:

Trades

Additions and subtractions

Draft picks 

The 1977 NHL amateur draft was held in Montreal, Quebec.

References
 Penguins on Hockey Database

Pittsburgh Penguins seasons
Pittsburgh
Pittsburgh
Pitts
Pitts